Evan James Berger (born 16 August 1987) is a former Australian footballer who last played for Marconi Stallions.

Club career

Early career
He has been involved in football since he was young, playing for the Burragorang District soccer club.

Melbourne Victory
Berger's club career began at Melbourne Victory FC after playing for Burragorang District Soccer Club, the Macarthur Rams, Parramatta Eagles, Australian Institute of Sport, Young Socceroos and the Marconi Stallions. In May 2007 he signed to Melbourne Victory, who offered him a two-year contract after only two training sessions with the club, as each A-League team was required three Under-20 signings. He completed the 2007 New South Wales Premier League season with Marconi before joining Melbourne in preparation to represent the team in the A-League 2007–08 season.

Perth Glory
For the 2011–12 A-League season he signed a two-year contract with the Perth Glory after struggling to get regular playing time at Melbourne Victory. Berger, along with teammates Dean Heffernan, Nick Ward and Lewis Italiano were released by the Glory at the end of the 2012–13 A-League season.

Retirement

In October 2013 Berger announced his retirement from professional football due to ongoing hamstring problems.

In 2017, Berger participated in Pennant Golf as a member of Cheltenham Golf Club's Pennant Team. Berger also won the Club Championship in 2017.

International career
Berger obtained a one-year scholarship at the Australian Institute of Sport in Canberra after impressing Australian under-20 selectors in 2005, who subsequently also offered him a place on the Australia national under-20 football team, or the Young Socceroos Squad. With the Young Socceroos he has toured Sri Lanka, Argentina, Malaysia, India and Chile, scoring his first international goal against the Vietnam national football team. He was one of twenty-three nominees for an informal Australia Day Award awarded by his local council, Wollondilly Shire Council, on the outskirts of Sydney, nominated for his international representation of Australia and also as a member of the New South Wales Combined High Schools and Australian Schoolboys teams.

A-League career statistics 
(Correct as of 19 February 2012)

Honours
With Melbourne Victory:
 A-League Championship: 2008–09
 A-League Premiership: 2008–09

References

External links
Melbourne Victory profile

1987 births
Living people
Melbourne Victory FC players
Perth Glory FC players
Soccer players from Sydney
Macarthur Rams FC players
A-League Men players
Parramatta FC players
Australian Institute of Sport soccer players
National Premier Leagues players
Association football wingers
Association football fullbacks
Australian soccer players